María Eizmendi Pérez (born 14 February 1972 in San Sebastián) is a Spanish slalom canoeist who competed at the international level from 1988 to 2000.

Competing in three Summer Olympics, she earned her best finish of 14th twice in the K1 event (1992, 2000).

World Cup individual podiums

References

1972 births
Canoeists at the 1992 Summer Olympics
Canoeists at the 1996 Summer Olympics
Canoeists at the 2000 Summer Olympics
Living people
Olympic canoeists of Spain
Spanish female canoeists
Sportspeople from San Sebastián
Canoeists from the Basque Country (autonomous community)